The Unicode Standard encodes almost all standard characters used in mathematics.
Unicode Technical Report #25 provides comprehensive information about the character repertoire, their properties, and guidelines for implementation.
Mathematical operators and symbols are in multiple Unicode blocks.  Some of these blocks are dedicated to, or primarily contain, mathematical characters while others are a mix of mathematical and non-mathematical characters.  This article covers all Unicode characters with a derived property of "Math".

Dedicated blocks

Mathematical Operators block

The Mathematical Operators block (U+2200–U+22FF) contains characters for mathematical, logical, and set notation.

Supplemental Mathematical Operators block

The Supplemental Mathematical Operators block (U+2A00–U+2AFF) contains various mathematical symbols, including N-ary operators, summations and integrals, intersections and unions, logical and relational operators, and subset/superset relations.

Mathematical Alphanumeric Symbols block

The Mathematical Alphanumeric Symbols block (U+1D400–U+1D7FF) contains Latin and Greek letters and decimal digits that enable mathematicians to denote different notions with different letter styles.  The reserved code points (the "holes") in the alphabetic ranges up to U+1D551 duplicate characters in the Letterlike Symbols block.

Letterlike Symbols block

The Letterlike Symbols block (U+2100–U+214F) includes variables.  Most alphabetic math symbols are in the Mathematical Alphanumeric Symbols block shown above.

The math subset of this block is U+2102, U+2107, U+210A–U+2113, U+2115, U+2118–U+2119, U+2124, U+2128–U+2129, U+212C, U+212F, U+2133, U+2135, U+213C–U+2149, and U+214B.

Miscellaneous Mathematical Symbols-A block

The Miscellaneous Mathematical Symbols-A block (U+27C0–U+27EF) contains characters for mathematical, logical, and database notation.

Miscellaneous Mathematical Symbols-B block

The Miscellaneous Mathematical Symbols-B block (U+2980–U+29FF) contains miscellaneous mathematical symbols, including brackets, angles, and circle symbols.

Miscellaneous Technical block

The Miscellaneous Technical block (U+2300–U+23FF) includes braces and operators.

The math subset of this block is U+2308–U+230B, U+2320-U+2321, U+237C, U+239B-U+23B5, 23B7, U+23D0, and U+23DC-U+23E2.

Geometric Shapes block

The Geometric Shapes block (U+25A0–U+25FF) contains geometric shape symbols.

The math subset of this block is U+25A0–25A1, U+25AE–25B7, U+25BC–25C1, U+25C6–25C7, U+25CA–25CB, U+25CF–25D3, U+25E2, U+25E4, U+25E7–25EC, and U+25F8–25FF.

Miscellaneous Symbols and Arrows block

The Miscellaneous Symbols and Arrows block (U+2B00–U+2BFF Arrows) contains arrows and geometric shapes with various fills.

The math subset of this block is U+2B30–2B44 and U+2B47–2B4C.

Arrows block

The Arrows block (U+2190–U+21FF) contains line, curve, and semicircle arrows and arrow-like operators.

Supplemental Arrows-A block

The Supplemental Arrows-A block (U+27F0–U+27FF) contains arrows and arrow-like operators.

Supplemental Arrows-B block

The Supplemental Arrows-B block (U+2900–U+297F) contains arrows and arrow-like operators (arrow tails, crossing arrows, curved arrows, and harpoons).

Combining Diacritical Marks for Symbols block

The Combining Diacritical Marks for Symbols block contains arrows, dots, enclosures, and overlays for modifying symbol characters.

The math subset of this block is U+20D0–U+20DC, U+20E1, U+20E5–U+20E6, and U+20EB–U+20EF.

Arabic Mathematical Alphabetic Symbols block

The Arabic Mathematical Alphabetic Symbols block (U+1EE00–U+1EEFF) contains characters used in Arabic mathematical expressions.

Characters in other blocks
Mathematical characters also appear in other blocks. Below is a list of these characters as of Unicode version 15.0:

See also 
 Glossary of mathematical symbols
 List of logic symbols
 Greek letters used in mathematics, science, and engineering
 List of letters used in mathematics and science
 List of mathematical uses of Latin letters
 Unicode subscripts and superscripts
 Unicode symbols
 CJK Compatibility Unicode symbols includes symbols for SI units
 Units for order of magnitude shows position of SI units

References

External links

Images of glyphs in section 6.3.3 of the 

Mathematical symbols